The Battle of Hill 31 was a battle between the Rhodesian security forces and ZANU insurgents- who had crossed the Rhodesian border with Mozambique on 15 November 1976.

References

Bibliography

Battles and operations of the Rhodesian Bush War
Conflicts in 1976
1976 in Rhodesia
November 1976 events in Africa